The team relay competition at the 2022 FIL European Luge Championships was held on 23 January 2022.

Results
The event was started at 13:03.

References

Team relay